Kluivert may refer to:

 Kenneth Kluivert (born 1941), Surinamese former footballer, father of below-mentioned Patrick
 Patrick Kluivert (born 1976), Dutch football coach and former footballer, father of below-mentioned Justin and Ruben
 Justin Kluivert (born 1999), Dutch footballer, son of above-mentioned Patrick
 Ruben Kluivert (born 2001), Dutch footballer, son of above-mentioned Patrick